David Little may refer to:

David Little (cricketer) (born 1974), New Zealand cricketer
David Little (linebacker) (1959–2005), former professional American football linebacker for the Pittsburgh Steelers
David Little (tight end) (born 1961), former professional American football tight end for the Philadelphia Eagles
David John Little (died 1984), MP in the Northern Ireland Parliament for West Down
David T. Little (born 1978), American composer and drummer
David M. Little (1861–1923), American businessman and politician from Salem, Massachusetts